Jarabá is a village and municipality in Brezno District, in the Banská Bystrica Region of central Slovakia.

History
In historical records, the village was first mentioned in 1540 as a mining settlement.

Genealogical resources

The records for genealogical research are available for Jarabá at the state archive "Statny Archiv in Banska Bystrica, Slovakia"

 Roman Catholic church records (births/marriages/deaths): 1656-1904 (parish B)
 Lutheran church records (births/marriages/deaths): 1784-1896 (parish B)

See also
 List of municipalities and towns in Slovakia

References

External links
https://web.archive.org/web/20071027094149/http://www.statistics.sk/mosmis/eng/run.html.  
http://www.jaraba.sk/
http://www.e-obce.sk/obec/jaraba/jaraba.html
Surnames of living people in Jaraba

Villages and municipalities in Brezno District